HNoMS Ellida was a 1. class gunboat built for the Royal Norwegian Navy. Like the other Norwegian gunships of her era, she carried a reasonable heavy armament on a diminutive hull. A distinct feature of Ellida was that her funnel could be raised and lowered as needed. The vessel was built at the Naval Yard at Horten, and had yard number 59.

It is unclear from the sources if the listed armament is the original armament, or if Ellida originally was armed with a much heavier main gun like the slightly older 1. class gunboat Sleipner. Ellida, like Sleipner, carried an underwater torpedo tube in her bow for firing Whitehead torpedoes, and she was the second vessel in the Royal Norwegian Navy equipped with this weapon.

Ellida underwent a refit in 1896, and was reclassified as a steam corvette. From 1898 she was used as a training vessel for cadets. In 1914 Ellida was refitted once more, and became the mother ship and support vessel for the early Norwegian submarines (the A class). She was decommissioned and sold off in 1925.

References

Ships built in Horten
1.-class gunboats
1880 ships
Training ships of the Royal Norwegian Navy